Zberg is a surname. Notable people with the surname include:

Beat Zberg (born 1971), Swiss cyclist
Luzia Zberg (born 1970), Swiss cyclist
Markus Zberg (born 1974), Swiss cyclist, brother of Beat

See also
Berg (surname)
Zber (1909–1942), Jewish artist